Ryan Leslie is the debut album of American R&B singer-songwriter and producer Ryan Leslie, released February 10, 2009 on Universal Motown in the United States. Three singles were released from the album: "Diamond Girl", "Addiction", and "How It Was Supposed to Be". The album was entirely produced by Leslie. While it received some negative criticism towards Leslie's songwriting, Ryan Leslie earned generally favorable reviews from music critics.

Track listing

Personnel
 Ryan Leslie: All keyboards, drum programming, background vocals and executive producer
 Chanel Iman: Additional keyboard on "Just Right"
 Tom "T-Bone" Wolk: Bass and guitar on "You're Fly", "Shouldn't Have To Wait" and "Wanna Be Good"
 Brent Paschke: Bass and guitar on "Quicksand"
 Jermaine Parrish: Drums and additional percussion on "I-R-I-N-A"
 Al Carty: Bass on "I-R-I-N-A"
 Tommy Mottola: Additional guitar on "Wanna Be Good"
 David Sancious: Keyboard on "Wanna Be Good"
 Recording engineers: Ryan Leslie, Anthony Palazzole, Scott Elgin, Rob Kinelski, Jim Caruana
 Mixing engineers: Ryan Leslie, Kevin Crouse, Jim Caruana
 Mastering: Chris Athens
 Photography: Armen Djerrahian, Kameron Crone

Chart positions

This album has gone on to sell 180,000 copies in the U.S.

References

External links
 Ryan Leslie MySpace
 Official NS4L website
 Ryan Leslie.com

2008 debut albums
Albums produced by Ryan Leslie
Ryan Leslie albums
Universal Motown Records albums